Zonosemata is a genus of tephritid  or fruit flies in the family Tephritidae, comprising six species from North America and one from South America. The species are as follows:
Zonosemata cocoyoc Bush, 1965
Zonosemata electa (Say, 1830)
Zonosemata macgregori Hernandez-Ortiz, 1989
Zonosemata minuta Bush, 1965
Zonosemata scutellata (Hendel, 1936)
Zonosemata vidrapennis Bush, 1965
Zonosemata vittigera (Coquillett, 1899)

References

Trypetinae
Tephritidae genera